The 2013–14 Top League Challenge Series was the 2013–14 edition of the Top League Challenge Series, a second-tier rugby union competition in Japan, in which teams from regionalised leagues competed for promotion to the Top League for the 2014–15 season. The competition was contested from 7 December 2013 to 26 January 2014.

Fukuoka Sanix Blues won promotion to the 2014–15 Top League, while Honda Heat, Mitsubishi Sagamihara DynaBoars and Yokogawa Musashino Atlastars progressed to the promotion play-offs.

Competition rules and information

The top two teams from the regional Top East League, Top West League and Top Kyūshū League qualified to the Top League Challenge Series. The regional league winners participated in Challenge 1, while the runners-up participated in Challenge 2. The winner of Challenge 2 also progressed to a four-team Challenge 1.

The top team in Challenge 1 won automatic promotion to the 2014–15 Top League, while the other three teams qualified to the promotion play-offs.

Qualification

The teams qualified to the Challenge 1 and Challenge 2 series through the 2013 regional leagues.

Top West League

The final standings for the 2013 Top West League were:

 Honda Heat qualified for Challenge 1.
 Chubu Electric Power qualified for Challenge 2.

Top East League

The final standings for the 2013 Top East League were:

 Mitsubishi Sagamihara DynaBoars qualified for Challenge 1.
 Yokogawa Musashino Atlastars qualified for Challenge 2.

Top Kyūshū League

The final standings for the 2013 Top Kyūshū League were:

 Chugoku Electric Power, Fukuoka Sanix Blues and Mazda Blue Zoomers qualified to the Second Phase.
 Nippon Steel Yawata were relegated to lower leagues.

 Fukuoka Sanix Blues qualified for Challenge 1.
 Mazda Blue Zoomers qualified for Challenge 2.

Challenge 1

Standings

The final standings for the 2013–14 Top League Challenge 1 were:

 Fukuoka Sanix Blues won promotion to the 2014–15 Top League.
 Honda Heat, Mitsubishi Sagamihara DynaBoars and Yokogawa Musashino Atlastars progressed to the promotion play-offs.

Matches

The following matches were played in the 2013–14 Top League Challenge 1:

Challenge 2

Standings

The final standings for the 2013–14 Top League Challenge 2 were:

 Yokogawa Musashino Atlastars progressed to Challenge 1.

Matches

The following matches were played in the 2013–14 Top League Challenge 2:

See also

 2013–14 Top League
 Top League Challenge Series

References

2013-14 Challenge
2013–14 in Japanese rugby union
2013–14 rugby union tournaments for clubs